This is a list of all venues which have hosted at least one Indian Premier League match.
2009 Indian Premier League was hosted wholly in South Africa, for the first time on overseas soil, due to 2009 Indian general election. In 2014, the first leg of the IPL was hosted in United Arab Emirates, due to 2014 Indian general election.

List of venues

In India

Overseas

References

External links

Indian Premier League lists